Sonoma Peak is a mountain located in southeastern Humboldt County, Nevada, United States. The peak is also the 28th most prominent peak in Nevada.

References 

Landforms of Humboldt County, Nevada
Mountains of Nevada
North American 2000 m summits